An ATP-sensitive potassium channel (or KATP channel) is a type of potassium channel that is gated by intracellular nucleotides, ATP and ADP. ATP-sensitive potassium channels are composed of Kir6.x-type subunits and sulfonylurea receptor (SUR) subunits, along with additional components. KATP channels are found in the plasma membrane; however some may also be found on subcellular membranes. These latter classes of KATP channels can be classified as being either sarcolemmal ("sarcKATP"), mitochondrial ("mitoKATP"), or nuclear ("nucKATP").

Discovery and structure 

KATP channels were first identified in cardiac myocytes by the Akinori Noma group in Japan. They have also been found in pancreas where they control insulin secretion, but are in fact widely distributed in plasma membranes. SarcKATP are composed of eight protein subunits (octamer). Four of these are members of the inward-rectifier potassium ion channel family Kir6.x (either Kir6.1 or Kir6.2), while the other four are sulfonylurea receptors (SUR1, SUR2A, and SUR2B). The Kir subunits have two transmembrane spans and form the channel's pore. The SUR subunits have three additional transmembrane domains, and contain two nucleotide-binding domains on the cytoplasmic side. These allow for nucleotide-mediated regulation of the potassium channel, and are critical in its roles as a sensor of metabolic status. These SUR subunits are also sensitive to sulfonylureas, MgATP (the magnesium salt of ATP), and some other pharmacological channel openers. While all sarcKATP are constructed of eight subunits in this 4:4 ratio, their precise composition varies with tissue type.

MitoKATP were first identified in 1991 by single-channel recordings of the inner mitochondrial membrane. The molecular structure of mitoKATP is less clearly understood than that of sarcKATP. Some reports indicate that cardiac mitoKATP consist of Kir6.1 and Kir6.2 subunits, but neither SUR1 nor SUR2.  More recently, it was discovered that certain multiprotein complexes containing succinate dehydrogenase can provide activity similar to that of KATP channels.

The presence of nucKATP was confirmed by the discovery that isolated patches of nuclear membrane possess properties, both kinetic and pharmacological, similar to plasma membrane KATP channels.

Sensor of cell metabolism

Regulation of gene expression 

Four genes have been identified as members of the KATP gene family. The sur1 and kir6.2 genes are located in chr11p15.1 while kir6.1 and sur2 genes reside in chr12p12.1. The kir6.1 and kir6.2 genes encode the pore-forming subunits of the KATP channel, with the SUR subunits being encoded by the sur1 (SUR1) gene or selective splicing of the sur2 gene (SUR2A and SUR2B).

Changes in the transcription of these genes, and thus the production of KATP channels, are directly linked to changes in the metabolic environment. High glucose levels, for example, induce a significant decrease in the kir6.2 mRNA level – an effect that can be reversed by lower glucose concentration. Similarly, 60 minutes of ischemia followed by 24 to 72 hours of reperfusion leads to an increase in kir6.2 transcription in left ventricle rat myocytes.

A mechanism has been proposed for the cell's KATP reaction to hypoxia and ischemia. Low intracellular oxygen levels decrease the rate of metabolism by slowing the TCA cycle in the mitochondria. Unable to transfer electrons efficiently, the intracellular NAD+/NADH ratio decreases, activating phosphotidylinositol-3-kinase and extracellular signal-regulated kinases. This, in turn, upregulates c-jun transcription, creating a protein which binds to the sur2 promoter.

One significant implication of the link between cellular oxidative stress and increased KATP production is that overall potassium transport function is directly proportional to the membrane concentration of these channels. In cases of diabetes, KATP channels cannot function properly, and a marked sensitivity to mild cardiac ischemia and hypoxia results from the cells' inability to adapt to adverse oxidative conditions.

Metabolite regulation 

The degree to which particular compounds are able to regulate KATP channel opening varies with tissue type, and more specifically, with a tissue's primary metabolic substrate.

In pancreatic beta cells, ATP is the primary metabolic source, and the ATP/ADP ratio determines KATP channel activity. Under resting conditions, the weakly inwardly rectifying KATP channels in pancreatic beta cells are spontaneously active, allowing potassium ions to flow out of the cell and maintaining a negative resting membrane potential (slightly more positive than the K+ reversal potential). In the presence of higher glucose metabolism, and consequently increased relative levels of ATP, the KATP channels close, causing the membrane potential of the cell to depolarize, activating voltage-gated calcium channels, and thus promoting the calcium-dependent release of insulin. The change from one state to the other happens quickly and synchronously, due to C-terminus multimerization among proximate KATP channel molecules.

Cardiomyocytes, on the other hand, derive the majority of their energy from long-chain fatty acids and their acyl-CoA equivalents. Cardiac ischemia, as it slows the oxidation of fatty acids, causes an accumulation of acyl-CoA and induces KATP channel opening while free fatty acids stabilize its closed conformation. This variation was demonstrated by examining transgenic mice, bred to have ATP-insensitive potassium channels. In the pancreas, these channels were always open, but remained closed in the cardiac cells.

Mitochondrial KATP and the regulation of aerobic metabolism 

Upon the onset of a cellular energy crisis, mitochondrial function tends to decline. This is due to alternating inner membrane potential, imbalanced trans-membrane ion transport, and an overproduction of free radicals, among other factors. In such a situation, mitoKATP channels open and close to regulate both internal Ca2+ concentration and the degree of membrane swelling. This helps restore proper membrane potential, allowing further H+ outflow, which continues to provide the proton gradient necessary for mitochondrial ATP synthesis. Without aid from the potassium channels, the depletion of high energy phosphate would outpace the rate at which ATP could be created against an unfavorable electrochemical gradient.

Nuclear and sarcolemmal KATP channels also contribute to the endurance of and recovery from metabolic stress. In order to conserve energy, sarcKATP open, reducing the duration of the action potential while nucKATP-mediated Ca2+ concentration changes within the nucleus favor the expression of protective protein genes.

Cardiovascular KATP channels and protection from ischemic injury 

Cardiac ischemia, while not always immediately lethal, often leads to delayed cardiomyocyte death by necrosis, causing permanent injury to the heart muscle. One method, first described by Keith Reimer in 1986, involves subjecting the affected tissue to brief, non-lethal periods of ischemia (3–5 minutes) before the major ischemic insult. This procedure is known as ischemic preconditioning ("IPC"), and derives its effectiveness, at least in part, from KATP channel stimulation.

Both sarcKATP and mitoKATP are required for IPC to have its maximal effects. Selective mitoKATP blockade with 5-hydroxydecanoic acid ("5-HD") or MCC-134 completely inhibits the cardioprotection afforded by IPC, and genetic knockout of sarcKATP genes in mice has been shown to increase the basal level of injury compared to wild type mice. This baseline protection is believed to be a result of sarcKATP's ability to prevent cellular Ca2+ overloading  and depression of force development during muscle contraction, thereby conserving scarce energy resources.

Absence of sarcKATP, in addition to attenuating the benefits of IPC, significantly impairs the myocyte's ability to properly distribute Ca2+, decreasing sensitivity to sympathetic nerve signals, and predisposing the subject to arrhythmia and sudden death. Similarly, sarcKATP regulates vascular smooth muscle tone, and deletion of the kir6.2 or sur2 genes leads to coronary artery vasospasm and death.

Upon further exploration of sarcKATP's role in cardiac rhythm regulation, it was discovered that mutant forms of the channel, particularly mutations in the SUR2 subunit, were responsible for dilated cardiomyopathy, especially after ischemia/reperfusion. It is still unclear as to whether opening of KATP channels has completely pro- or antiarrhythmic effects. Increased potassium conductance should stabilize membrane potential during ischemic insults, reducing the extent infarct and ectopic pacemaker activity. On the other hand, potassium channel opening accelerates repolarization of the action potential, possibly inducing arrhythmic reentry.

See also
 Cardiac action potential#Channels

References

Further reading

External links